The Burial Laws Amendment Act 1880 (43 & 44 Vict c 41) is an Act of the Parliament of the United Kingdom. It is one of the Burial Acts 1852 to 1885.

This Act is excluded by section 4 of the Welsh Church (Burial Grounds) Act 1945.

For the construction of references in this Act to a "parish" or "burial board", in the application of this Act to Greater London, see section 44(4) of the London Government Act 1963.

From 1882 to 1961, this Act was applied by section 3 of the Interments (felo de se) Act 1882.

Preamble
The preamble was repealed by the Statute Law Revision Act 1894.

Section 7 – Burials to be conducted in a decent and orderly manner and without obstruction
This section reads:

"Riotous"

This expression is defined by sections 10(3) and (4) of the Public Order Act 1986.

Sentence

A person guilty of this offence is liable to imprisonment for a term not exceeding two years.

Where a person is convicted on indictment of this offence, the court, if not precluded from sentencing an offender by its exercise of some other power, may impose a fine instead of or in addition to dealing with him in any other way in which the court has power to deal with him, subject however to any enactment requiring the offender to be dealt with in a particular way.

Proposal for repeal

In 1985, the Law Commission said that this offence was no longer used and recommended that it be repealed.

In 1981, they said that in relation to cemeteries and crematoria managed by local authorities, this offence was effectively superseded by articles 18 and 19 of the Local Authorities' Cemeteries Order 1977 (SI 1977/204), made under section 214 of the Local Government Act 1972. They also said that there was a considerable overlap with the offence in section 2 of the Ecclesiastical Courts Jurisdiction Act 1860.

Section 11 – Order of coroner or certificate of registrar to be delivered to relative, etc instead of to person who buries
This section was repealed by section 13(1) of, and Second Schedule to, the Births and Deaths Registration Act 1926.

References
Halsbury's Statutes,

External links
The Burial Laws Amendment Act 1880, as amended from the National Archives.
The Burial Laws Amendment Act 1880, as originally enacted from the National Archives.

Burials in the United Kingdom
Legal aspects of death
United Kingdom Acts of Parliament 1880